

See also
 Immune sera, immunoglobulins and vaccines for veterinary use are in the ATCvet group QI.

References

J